Bad Blood: A Cautionary Tale is a documentary film about contaminated hemophilia blood products. The film was co-written by Marilyn Ness and Sheila Curran Bernard, produced and directed by Marilyn Ness, with cinematography by David Ford, editing by Marion Sears Hunter, and original music score by Joel Goodman and David Bramfitt. The film premiered on July 28, 2010 in New York City.

References

External links
 

2010 films
Haemophilia
2010s English-language films
American documentary films
2010 documentary films
Documentary films about health care
Documentary films about HIV/AIDS
Works about contaminated haemophilia blood products
HIV/AIDS in American films
2010s American films